The Turner-Cottman Building, at 120-130 West Second Street in Casper, Wyoming, was listed on the National Register of Historic Places in 2015.

It was built in 1924.  It was designed by architect Leon Goodrich at an early point in his career, while in partnership with DuBois.

References

National Register of Historic Places in Natrona County, Wyoming
Commercial architecture in Wyoming
Buildings and structures completed in 1924